The Puleston Cross is a Butter cross in the market town of Newport, in the Telford and Wrekin district, in the cereminial county of Shropshire, England.

The Cross sits in Middle Row, formerly Rotten Row, and  denotes the market place. The cross was built in the early 14th century and was moved to this position in 1633 after the new market hall was built by William Adams. 

The cross was set up in memory of Sir Roger de Pyvelesdon who died in 1272, in Shropshire. This is confirmed in a deed dated 1285, signed by his son and namesake Sir Roger de Puleston, which includes these words: the cross set up for the soul of Roger de Pyvelesdon who died in 1272.

It has remained in its current position since the 13th century, and the Butter Cross (market) was built around it by Richard Barnefield in 1632. Some records indicate that it was rebuilt by Thomas Talbott in 1665. The market was demolished in 1866. It was taken down as there was no further use for it when the new market hall was built.

The Market cross was spared demolition and given railings to protect the cross from damage; these have since been taken down.

The market cross consists of five steep octagonal steps leading to the remains of a square-sectioned fluted shaft made from Sandstone and is overall 500cm high.

2010 redevelopment
In the summer of 2010 the cobbles that surrounded the monument were removed and replaced with paving, stopping cars parking around the cross, with archaeologists from English Hermitage carrying out work on the surroundings of the monument, uncovering that the monument had stood in the same position since around 1280 and finding the foundations of the 1850s market hall.

This meant the designs for the Buttercross pavements were amended so that the footprint of the foundations can be traced and by digging a small, deeper hole around the monument, the team have also unearthed original cobbles which appear to date back hundreds of years and small pieces of china and animal teeth were also found and have been taken away for examination.

See also
Listed buildings in Newport, Shropshire

References

Monuments and memorials in Shropshire
Cross symbols
Buildings and structures in Newport, Shropshire
Grade II listed buildings in Shropshire
Scheduled monuments in Shropshire